Delta and Notch-like epidermal growth factor-related receptor is a protein that in humans is encoded by the DNER gene.

References

Further reading